The Nanjing Metro is a rapid transit system serving the urban and suburban districts of Nanjing, the capital city of Jiangsu Province in the People's Republic of China.

Proposals for a metro system serving Nanjing first began in 1984, with approval by the State Planning Commission granted in 1994. Construction began on the initial 16-station Line 1 in 1999, and opened in 2005. It is operated and maintained by the Nanjing Metro Group Company. Future expansion plans include 30 lines set to open within the next few years, with several more awaiting approval to begin construction.

History

Early proposals
In 1984 the first serious proposal for construction of a subway appeared in the Municipal People's Congress. In April 1986, the Nanjing Integrated Transport Planning group was established to research on how to implement a subway system in Nanjing. In December 1986 the team published the "Nanjing Metro Initial Phase". The phase consists of a north–south line, east–west line and a diagonal Northwest to Southeast line. The three lines meet in the city center forming a triangle. A revision of the "Nanjing City Master Plan" in 1993 added another line through the urban core, and three light metro lines connecting Nanjing's suburbs in Pukou and the at time proposed new airport. In addition a suburban railway to Longtan was proposed. A 1999 report on "Nanjing city rapid rail transit network planning" further proposed six subway lines, two subway extensions and three light metro lines.

In 1994, the State Planning Commission approved the preparatory work for the subway only to have the entire metro project postponed in 1995 amid a national freeze on new metro projects.

Major changes were made to "Nanjing Urban Rail Transit Network Planning" in 2003. The new master plan consisted of 13 lines, of which nine are subway lines and four are light metro lines. The new Line 6 will be a loop line connecting all the urban radial lines. The plan retained the original lines 1, 2 and 3 from the previous plan. According to the new plan, the initial phase would consist of the completion of Metro Line 1 and 2 by 2010. Together the two lines will form a basic "cross" network. By 2020 the completion of Lines 1, 2, 3, and 4 was to form a more robust "pound" shaped (#) network. Longer-term plans include the construction of a loop line connecting all existing lines. The plan also identified four subway lines crossing the Yangtze river.

First line
The initial section of Line 1 from Maigaoqiao to Xiaohang received final official approval in 1999. In May 2000, the Experimental Station resumed construction with the entire Line 1 project in full construction in December.

A western extension of Line 1 from Xiaohang to a newly built stadium was fast tracked after Nanjing won hosting the National Games. The opening of the Nanjing Metro Line 1 gave Nanjing the sixth metro system in the Chinese mainland after Beijing, Tianjin, Shanghai, Guangzhou and Shenzhen.

Current system

Line 1

Line 1 runs mainly in a north–south direction. The line starts at Maigaoqiao in the north, heading southwards to CPU (China Pharmaceutical University). The Olympic Sport Center branch line broke away from Line 1 and formed parts of Line 10, when the latter's construction finished and entered operation on July 1, 2014. Line 1's color is light blue.

Line 2

It runs mainly in an east–west direction, from Yuzui in the southwest to Jingtianlu in the northeast. It entered into operation on May 28, 2010.
On 28 December 2021, the line was extended west  with 4 new stations to Yuzui Station. Line 2's color is red.

Line 3

Groundbreaking work for Line 3 started in January 2010. Line 3's color is green.

Line 4

Construction of east–west Line 4 begun in late 2012 and the first phase entered operation on January 18, 2017. The line is known as A Zi (the Purple) as the branding for the line and the train color is purple, the first of which were delivered in April 2015. The line started operation on January 18, 2017. Line 4's color is purple.

Line 7

Line 7 is a northeast–southwest line roughly following the south bank of the Yangtze River. The south section has been under construction since November 2017. The rest of the line started construction in November 2018. The north section opened on 28 December 2022. This line is also the first line of Nanjing Metro to use GoA4 automated trains. Line 7's color is dark green.

Line 10

Line 10 is a western extension from Line 1's Olympic Stadium branch line, which broke away from Line 1 and formed part of Line 10 when the new line was completed. Construction started in February 2012, finished in 2014. Line 10's color is beige.

Line S1

Line S1 acts as Nanjing's airport express line, connecting Nanjing South Railway Station to Gaochun District via Nanjing Lukou International Airport. The first phase from Nanjing South to Lukou International Airport started construction on December 27, 2011, and finished in 2014. The first phase opened on July 1, 2014, in time for the Nanjing 2014 Summer Youth Olympics. The second phase extension later became Line S9. Line S1's color is teal.

Line S3

Line S3 opened on 6 December 2017. It starts from Nanjing South Railway Station and heads west, crossing the Yangtze River on the cantilever along the edge of Dashengguan Yangzte River bridge together with high-speed rail trains, before terminating at the Gaojiachong station in Qiaolin, southwest of Pukou District. Originally planned as Metro Line 12 or the Ninghe Intercity Rail Line, the route started construction in late 2011. Besides Nanjing South Railway Station in which passengers can transfer to Lines 1, 3, or S1, Youfangqiao station is also a transfer station between Line S3 and Line 2. Phase 2 is now still being planned, which might extends further southwest from Phase 1 to Hexian county in the far future. Line S3's color is magenta.

Line S6

Line S6 or the Nanjing-Jurong Intercity Railway is a  connecting suburban Nanjing with neighboring Jurong opened on 28 December 2021. It is the first line in Nanjing Metro that reaches other cities, starting at Maqun station, ending at Jurong station. Line S6's color is lilac.

Line S7

Line S7 opened on 26 May 2018. It is an extension of Line S1 further southeast, starting at Konggangxinchengjiangning station, ending at Wuxiangshan station in South Lishui District. Some Line S1 trains continue to operate into Line S7. Line S7's color is pink.

Line S8

Line S8 is a suburban metro line which connects Luhe District to Pukou District. The line features 17 stations including 6 underground stations and 11 elevated ones. Construction of the line started on June 21, 2012, and it was officially opened on August 1, 2014. Line S8's color is orange.

Line S9

Upon opening on December 30, 2017, Nanjing became the first city in mainland China where every district  is accessible by metro. Line S9's color is yellow.

Under-construction projects

Line 5

Line 5 received approval on 14 January 2015.

Line 6
Line 6 is a 32.4 km fully underground line with 19 stations. Construction started on 28 December 2019.

Line 9 
Line 9 (Phase 1) is a  have a total of 16 stations, all of which are underground. The symbol of the train is orange red, and the maximum speed is 80 km/h. The route passes through Xuanwu District, Gulou District and Jianye District, and passes through Nanjing Railway Station, Xiaguan, Longjiang, Lüboyuan, Jiangsu Grand Theater and other areas. In the future, it will become an important line within the main city to connect the central Hexi, Xiaguan and Xinzhuang areas. The regional line is of great significance to the development of Hexi New City and the upgrading and reconstruction of the Xiaguan area. Construction started in May 2020, the construction period is about 4 years.
The list of stations: Danxialu, Caohouxun, Nanjing Railway Station, Zhongyangmen, Chenghecun, Daqiaonanlu, Xiaguan, Agricultural Trade Centre, Dinghuaimendajie, Longjiang, Guanziqiao, Hanzhongmendajie, Shuiximendajie, Qinghelu, Lüboyuan and Binjianggongyuan.
In the southern extension of Phase 2, Line 9 is expected to be extended all the way to Banqiao in the far south west of Nanjing.

Line S4 
Line S4 or the Nanjing-Chuzhou Intercity Railway is a   connecting suburban Nanjing with neighboring Lai'an and Chuzhou of Anhui. The line will feature passing loops at select stations to allow for distinct express and local services. The line is planned to open by 2022. The line is planned to connect with the Chuzhou Metro.

Ticket system
Fares on the Nanjing Subway are distance-based. Fares range from 2 yuan (approx US$0.30) for journeys under 8 stations, to 4 yuan for longer journeys. There is a 5% discount for users of the Nanjing Public Utility IC Card. Fares can also be paid using Alipay.

Single tickets

Single journey tickets can be purchased from the ticket vending machine or at a ticket window. The ticket vending machine accepts both coins and bills (¥5 and ¥10).

Transit card

Apart from one-way tickets, fares can be paid with the Nanjing Public Utility IC Card, or Jinlingtong. It can be purchased for a refundable fee of 25 yuan (about 3.8 dollars) and refilled at ticket booths inside the metro stations as well as many collaborative convenience stores throughout the city. The card can be used to pay for other means of public transportation, such as the city taxi and the city bus.

This transit card is similar to Beijing's Yikatong, and the Octopus card of Hong Kong's MTR.

Rolling stock
 20 six-car Alstom/Nanjing Puzhen Rolling Stock Works Metropolis sets - ordered in 2002 for Line 1 opening.
 21 six-car Alstom/Nanjing Puzhen Rolling Stock Works Metropolis ordered January 2008 for Line 1 extension.
 24 six-car Alstom/Nanjing Puzhen Rolling Stock Works Metropolis cars ordered 2007 for Line 2.
 26 four-car Alstom/Nanjing Puzhen Rolling Stock Works Metropolis cars ordered 2013 for Line S8.
 29 six-car Alstom/Nanjing Puzhen Rolling Stock Works Metropolis cars ordered 2013 for Line 4.

Signalling system

For Line 1, Siemens Transportation Systems (TS) was awarded the supply contract in November 2002.

For Line 2, Siemens Transportation Systems (TS) and its local partner Nanjing Research Institute of Electronic Technology (NRIET) have been awarded to supply the signaling system after signing a contract (about 25 million Euro). Technologies used include Trainguard MT, Vicos OC 501, Sicas ECC and Az S 350 U axle counting system.

Gallery

Network Map

See also
 List of Nanjing Metro stations
 Nanjing trams
 List of metro systems

Notes

 Discrepancies between these figures are explained by interchange stations. If interchange stations are counted once for each line they serve, there would be 114 urban line stations, 50 S-line stations, and 164 total stations.

References

External links

 Nanjing Metro – official website 
 Nanjing at UrbanRail.net

 
Siemens Mobility projects
Railway lines opened in 2005
2005 establishments in China
Projects established in 1984